Scouting in New Hampshire has a long history, from the 1910s to the present day, serving thousands of youth in programs that suit the environment in which they live.

Early history (1910-1950) 
In 1912, two years after the Boy Scouts of America (BSA) were founded in the United States, the Manchester Council (#330), a volunteer-led council, was organized. Initially there were only two troops, both of them chartered by the YMCA. As Scouting grew in popularity, three more makeshift and unrecognized councils sprang up in Dover, Claremont, and Portsmouth. The council grew steadily and added a Scout Executive to its staff in 1919.

On January 9, 1920, the Manchester Council was granted an official charter with the Boy Scouts of America. At that time, the council represented ten troops and 256 Scouts within Manchester, and 87 troops with a total of 1621 Scouts in New Hampshire. In 1925, the Manchester Council acquired Camp Manning in Gilmanton for use as a summer camp. While the Manchester Council grew rapidly, the rest of New Hampshire's Scouting program saw limited growth.

On May 25, 1929, the Manchester Council was renamed the Daniel Webster Council (#330), and expanded to cover Scouting for the entire state. The new name was derived from New Hampshire statesman Daniel Webster.

Recent history (1950-present) 
Originally, the Daniel Webster Council operated Camp Manning in Gilmanton and Camp Carpenter in Manchester. In 1945, Camp Carpenter became the official Scout camp for the Daniel Webster Council. In 1969, the council, under the leadership of Max I. Silber, established the Lawrence L. Lee Scout Museum at Camp Carpenter, to recognize the council's longtime Scout Executive. In 1971, the Daniel Webster Council acquired Hidden Valley Scout Reservation from the Norumbega Council in Massachusetts. Hidden Valley is located near Gilmanton Iron Works, New Hampshire. In the late 1980s, Camp Carpenter became a Cub Scouts camp during the summer months. In the early 2000s, Hidden Valley was renamed the Griswold Scout Reservation. It was divided into two camps: Hidden Valley and the new Camp Bell.

Hidden Valley and Camp Carpenter are run as traditional Scout camps with full dining facilities and a wide variety of program areas and activities. Camp Bell is run with a higher emphasis on strengthening the Patrol Method. Campers do their own cooking in their sites, and participate in day-long activities as patrols. Camp Bell has a different variety of activities from Hidden Valley, including their "living history areas", and a different set of merit badges are available.

Together Hidden Valley and Camp Bell make up the Griswold Scout Reservation which covers over  including several lakes, ponds, and mountains. The land currently used primarily by Camp Bell has been used as the homes of many other camps, most recently Camp Manning, which after being sold by the Daniel Webster Council to private owners, changed ownership several times and had previously existed as a camp run by various organization such as the YMCA who called it Camp Leo. Camp Bell was named for an attorney member of the Council's Executive Board who was instrumental in reacquiring the property for the Daniel Webster Council.

The Council also operates three additional facilities—Pierre Hoge in Walpole, Camp Whipporwill in Merrimack, and the Unity Program Center in Unity.

Boy Scouts of America in New Hampshire
There is one Boy Scouts of America local council serving New Hampshire.

Daniel Webster Council

Spirit of Adventure Council 

With Boston Minuteman Council and Yankee Clipper Council merging to form the Spirit of Adventure Council, the units of Yankee Clipper Council in New Hampshire have been transferred into the Daniel Webster Council, effective April 1, 2015.

On January 1, 1993, the North Essex Council, the North Bay Council, and the Lone Tree Council were merged to form the Yankee Clipper Council. In December 1999 the Greater Lowell Council was also merged into the Yankee Clipper Council. Today the council has five districts, serving a large corner of northern Massachusetts and southern New Hampshire. With eight towns (Atkinson, East Kingston, Hampstead, Kingston, Newton, Plaistow, Seabrook and South Hampton) located in the Lone Tree District, Yankee Clipper Council is the smaller of the two  councils in the Granite State. Until 2007, Yankee Clipper Council operated Camp Onway in Raymond, New Hampshire.

Girl Scouting in New Hampshire

In January 2009 Girl Scouts of Swift Water Council which served New Hampshire and 60 towns in southeastern Vermont merged with the Girl Scout Council of Vermont.

Girl Scouts of the Green and White Mountains serves 14,500 girls in New Hampshire and Vermont. It is one of 112 councils chartered by Girl Scouts of the USA.

Service centers
Bedford, New Hampshire - One Commerce Dr PO Box 10832 Bedford, NH 03110-0832 603.627.4158 or 888.474.9686
Williston, Vermont - Mansfield Business Park 60 Knight Ln Ste 30 Williston, VT 05495 888.474.9686
Portsmouth, New Hampshire - Camp Seawood 603.436.1938 or 603.610.0285

Camps
New Hampshire
Camp Chenoa -  near Antrim
Camp Kettleford -  near Bedford
Camp Seawood -  near Portsmouth
Monadnock Wilderness area -  just north of Mount Monadnock near Dublin
Sunset Valley -  in Gorham

Vermont
It surrounds  Lake Abenaki. It was started as an all-girls' camp in 1909 as Camp Hanoum, and became a Girl Scout camp in 1959. The 100th anniversary was celebrated in 2009.
Twin Hills in Richmond

Financial aid (also known as campership) provides assistance to girls who live in Green and White Mountains' jurisdiction who could not otherwise afford to attend a Green and White Mountains camp.

Scouting museums in New Hampshire 

In 1967, prominent Scouter Max I. Silber sought to display several articles that he had acquired from his many Scout trips around the world. Amongst other artifacts, Max had been given many personal effects of Scouting founder Robert Baden-Powell from his widow, Lady Olave Baden-Powell, including original drawings, and writings from the founder. Max and his good friend Council Executive Lawrence L. "Larry" Lee discussed the idea of displaying the collection, and they decided to build a small museum at Camp Carpenter in Manchester.  . Larry died before the museum was finished, and it was decided that it was only fitting to name the museum after him. The Lawrence L. Lee Scouting Museum opened its doors in 1969.

In 1978, the museum needed to expand, and it was decided to also build a library where the large collection of Scout books could be displayed and used as a place to learn about Scouting's vast history. The Museum Committee elected to name the library after Max, who on top of his great dedication and service to Scouting around the world was the catalyst for the museum's founding.

The Lawrence L. Lee Scouting Museum and Max I. Silber Library are run by a volunteer staff and committee who keep the museum open every Saturday, and each day in July and August.  They never have had to charge for admission.

Scouting events in New Hampshire 
The Daniel Webster Council sponsors a statewide Scouts BSA Jamboree every four years, a three-day program which gathers up to 5,000 Scouts and guests from New Hampshire and the surrounding areas. The most recent New Hampshire Jamboree was named "NHXperience" held May 4-6, 2018, at the New Hampshire Motor Speedway in Loudon.

References

External links
 Lawrence L. Lee Scouting Museum
 nhjambo.org

Youth organizations based in New Hampshire
New Hampshire
Northeast Region (Boy Scouts of America)